William A. Navas Jr. (born December 15, 1942) is a retired United States Army major general who served as the director of the Army National Guard. He is also the first Puerto Rican to be named an Assistant Secretary of the Navy.

Early life and education
Navas was born in Mayagüez, Puerto Rico, on December 15, 1942. His family has a long tradition of military service, including his grandfather, Colonel Antonio M. Navas, who served in both World Wars. His father, Captain William A. Navas Sr. served in World War II and had a successful career in civil engineering upon his retirement from the military.

Navas received his primary and secondary education in his hometown of Mayagüez. In high school he joined Zeta Mu Gamma fraternity.   After graduating from high school, he enrolled in the University of Puerto Rico, Mayagüez Campus, and received his Bachelor of Science degree in civil engineering. He joined the Beta-Activo chapter of Phi Sigma Alpha fraternity, and served as chapter president from 1963 to 1964.

In addition to his degree from the University of Puerto Rico, Navas completed a Master of Science degree in Management Engineering at the University of Bridgeport.

Navas completed Army qualification courses for the Engineer, Military Police, and Infantry branches. He also completed specialty courses including Jungle Warfare. He was the Distinguished Graduate of his class at the United States Army Command and General Staff College, and graduated from the Inter-American Defense College. Navas also completed the Program for Senior Managers in Government at Harvard University's John F. Kennedy School of Government.

Career

Navas completed the ROTC program while in college, and joined the United States Army as a second lieutenant of Engineers. He served more than five years on active duty, primarily in West Germany. From 1968 to 1969 he served in Vietnam as commander of Company A, 168th Engineer Battalion.

In 1970 Navas joined his family's construction business (Navas y Moreda), and became a member of the Puerto Rico Army National Guard. He advanced through a series of command and staff assignments, including command of the 125th Military Police Battalion, 1st Battalion, 296th Infantry Regiment and Combined Task Force, 193rd Infantry Brigade, attaining the rank of colonel in 1981.

In 1981 he became a full-time member of the National Guard. After serving in several assignments at the Headquarters of the Puerto Rico National Guard, in 1987 he was selected to succeed Richard D. Dean as deputy director of the Army National Guard and promoted to brigadier general.

In 1990 he was chosen for the position of Vice Chief of the National Guard Bureau and promoted to major general.

Navas served as Vice Chief until 1992, when he became executive officer of the Reserve Forces Policy Board.

From September 1994 through October 1995 Navas was Deputy Assistant Secretary of Defense for Reserve Affairs.

In October 1995, Navas was assigned as director of the Army National Guard, and he served until May, 1998. He was succeeded by Roger C. Schultz.

From June, 1998 until retiring from the military in October, 1998 Navas was a special assistant in the Office of the Vice Chief of Staff of the United States Army.

Assistant Secretary of the Navy
After retiring from the military Navas became the chairman of the American Veteran's Committee for Puerto Rico Self-Determination, an organization which he co-founded.

On June 6, 2001, Navas was nominated by President George W. Bush to serve as the Assistant Secretary of the Navy (Manpower and Reserve Affairs). He was sworn in on July 17, 2001, and served through January, 2008.

From 2008 to 2011 Navas served as executive director of the National Security Professional Development Integration Office at the United States Department of Defense, the first individual to hold this position.

Later work
Since 2011, Navas has been a senior advisor at Dawson & Associates, a Washington, D.C. consulting firm.

Military decorations and awards

Badges:
   Office of the Secretary of Defense Identification Badge
   Army Staff Identification Badge
 The Venezuelan Bar of Honor Insignia

Other recognition
 In 2001, Navas was honored with the Achievement Award by Hispanic magazine.
 In 2008 he was awarded the "Caballero Sigma" medal by Phi Sigma Alpha fraternity.

Effective dates of promotions

See also

 List of Puerto Ricans
 List of Puerto Rican military personnel
 University of Puerto Rico at Mayaguez people

References

Further reading
 Puertorriquenos Who Served With Guts, Glory, and Honor. Fighting to Defend a Nation Not Completely Their Own; by : Greg Boudonck;

External links
 

1942 births
Living people
Puerto Rican military officers
People from Mayagüez, Puerto Rico
University of Puerto Rico alumni
University of Bridgeport alumni
United States Army Command and General Staff College alumni
Harvard Kennedy School alumni
Puerto Rican Army personnel
National Guard (United States) generals
United States Army personnel of the Vietnam War
United States Army generals
Recipients of the Legion of Merit
Recipients of the Defense Distinguished Service Medal
Recipients of the Distinguished Service Medal (US Army)
Recipients of the Air Medal
Recipients of the Defense Superior Service Medal
Recipients of the Meritorious Service Medal (United States)
Republican Party (Puerto Rico) politicians
George W. Bush administration personnel
United States Army reservists
United States Assistant Secretaries of the Navy
Puerto Rico National Guard personnel
Recipients of the Humanitarian Service Medal